The following is a list of ecoregions in Myanmar (also known as Burma).

Terrestrial ecoregions
Myanmar is in the Indomalayan realm. ecoregions are listed by biome.

Tropical and subtropical moist broadleaf forests
 Andaman Islands rain forests (India, Myanmar)
 Chin Hills–Arakan Yoma montane forests (Myanmar, India)
 Irrawaddy freshwater swamp forests (Myanmar)
 Irrawaddy moist deciduous forests (Myanmar)
 Kayah–Karen montane rain forests (Myanmar, Thailand)
 Lower Gangetic Plains moist deciduous forests (Bangladesh, India, Myanmar)
 Mizoram–Manipur–Kachin rain forests (Myanmar, Bangladesh, India)
 Myanmar coastal rain forests (Myanmar)
 Northern Indochina subtropical forests (Myanmar, China, Laos, Thailand, Vietnam)
 Northern Triangle subtropical forests (Myanmar)
 Tenasserim–South Thailand semi-evergreen rain forests (Myanmar, Malaysia, Thailand)

Tropical and subtropical dry broadleaf forests
 Central Indochina dry forests (Cambodia, Laos, Thailand, Vietnam, Myanmar)
 Irrawaddy dry forests (Myanmar)

Tropical and subtropical coniferous forests
 Northeast India–Myanmar pine forests (Myanmar, India)

Temperate broadleaf and mixed forests
 Eastern Himalayan broadleaf forests (Bhutan, India, Nepal, Myanmar)
 Northern Triangle temperate forests (Myanmar)
 Nujiang Lancang Gorge alpine conifer and mixed forests (Myanmar, China)

Temperate coniferous forests
 Eastern Himalayan subalpine conifer forests (Bhutan, India, Nepal, Myanmar)

Mangroves
 Myanmar Coast mangroves (Myanmar, Thailand, Bangladesh, Malaysia)

Montane grasslands and shrublands
 Eastern Himalayan alpine shrub and meadows (Myanmar, Bhutan, China, India, Nepal)

Freshwater ecoregions
 Chin Hills-Arakan Coast (Bangladesh, India, Myanmar)
 Sitang-Irrawaddy (China, India, Myanmar)
 Mekong (Cambodia, China, Laos, Myanmar, Thailand, Vietnam)
 Lower Lancang (Mekong) (China, Laos, Myanmar, Thailand)
 Salween (China, Myanmar, Thailand)
 Lower and Middle Salween (China, Myanmar, Thailand)
 Inle Lake (Myanmar)
 Upper Salween (China, Myanmar)

Marine ecoregions
Myanmar's seas are in the Western Indo-Pacific marine realm. Myanmar's two marine ecoregions are:
 Andaman Sea Coral Coast
 Northern Bay of Bengal

See also

References

 
Myanmar
Ecoregions